The 2014–15 season of the Regionalliga was the 56th season of the third-tier football league in Austria, since its establishment in 1959.

Regionalliga Ost

Regionalliga Mitte

Regionalliga West

Promotion play-offs
Due to SC Ritzing failure to get a Bundesliga license, SC-ESV Parndorf 1919, who finished second in the Ost division, and SK Austria Klagenfurt, who finished first in the Mitte division, will participate in a two-legged tie. The winner on aggregate score after both matches will be promoted to the Austrian Football First League.

First leg

Second leg

References

External links
 Regionalliga Ost  
 Regionalliga Mitte  
 Regionalliga West  

Austrian Regionalliga seasons
Austrian Regional League
3